is a Japanese curler from Sapporo. He competed at the 2015 Ford World Men's Curling Championship in Halifax, Nova Scotia, Canada, as vice-skip for the Japanese team, which placed sixth in the tournament.

Personal life
Shimizu is employed as a warehouse worker for Shizunai Logos. His sister is Japanese curler Emi Shimizu.

References

External links

1988 births
Living people
Japanese male curlers
Sportspeople from Nagano Prefecture
People from Karuizawa, Nagano
Asian Games medalists in curling
Curlers at the 2017 Asian Winter Games
Medalists at the 2017 Asian Winter Games
Asian Games silver medalists for Japan
Curlers at the 2018 Winter Olympics
Olympic curlers of Japan
Pacific-Asian curling champions
Sportspeople from Sapporo
Competitors at the 2007 Winter Universiade